Coufouleux is a commune in the Tarn department in southern France.

Transport

Rabastens-Couffouleux station has rail connections to Toulouse, Albi and Rodez.

See also
Communes of the Tarn department

References

Communes of Tarn (department)